The Daily Sceptic is a blog created by British commentator Toby Young. It has published misinformation about COVID-19 vaccines and climate change denial.

History 
Young founded The Daily Sceptic as a successor to his previous blog Lockdown Sceptics, which was set up in April 2020. He serves as the website's editor-in-chief.

Content

COVID-19 vaccine misinformation 

In October 2021, The Daily Sceptic published an article suggesting that Office for National Statistics (ONS) data showing an increase in the number of teenage deaths between June and September 2021 was connected to the rollout of COVID-19 vaccines in the United Kingdom. The ONS confirmed that the figures were accurate, but added that there was no evidence to link the increase in deaths to the COVID-19 vaccines.

In November 2021, The Daily Sceptic used data published in a UK Health Security Agency (UKHSA) report to claim that 71% of adults hospitalised with COVID-19 were vaccinated. The disinformation analysis organisation Logically noted that the complete UKHSA report cautioned against using the raw data to estimate vaccine effectiveness due to it not taking inherent biases such as "differences in risk, behaviour and testing" into account.

In September 2022, The Daily Sceptic reported on a declaration by a group of scientists and doctors claiming that the COVID-19 vaccines were causing an "international medical crisis". The fact-checking website Health Feedback noted that The Daily Sceptic did not acknowledge that the claims made in the declaration had previously been fact-checked and found to be inaccurate, unsupported or misleading.

Also in September 2022, PayPal shut down the accounts of Young, the Free Speech Union and The Daily Sceptic. The accounts were closed because of breaches of PayPal's acceptable use policy, thought to be because of misinformation about COVID-19 vaccines. The accounts were restored later that month after extensive criticism of PayPal's actions by MPs.

In December 2022, The Daily Sceptic claimed that a study published in the Clinical Research in Cardiology journal showed that people who had "died suddenly" were likely killed by the COVID-19 vaccines. The article was widely shared on social media, due to the phrase "died suddenly" being associated with an anti-vaccine film of the same name. Experts consulted by Health Feedback found that the claim was not supported by the study's actual findings.

Climate change denial 

In August 2022, Young wrote a Daily Sceptic article claiming that the World Climate Declaration had "dealt a savage blow" to the idea that man-made greenhouse gas emissions are responsible for climate change, and arguing that global warming may instead be a natural event. Climate Feedback noted that the signatories of the World Climate Declaration had ties to fossil fuel interests, and that experts in the field of climatology had concluded that human greenhouse gas emissions are predominantly responsible for climate change.

In October 2022, a Daily Sceptic article said that studies in Greenland showed that climate change is caused by natural factors rather than carbon emissions. The scientists behind said studies told Agence France-Presse that The Daily Sceptic had misrepresented their findings, and that the impact of fossil fuels on global warming was well-documented.

See also
Noah Carl - A contributor to the website

References

External links 

 

British blogs
Climate change denial
COVID-19 vaccine misinformation and hesitancy